Marian Witold Glinka (1 June 1943 in Warsaw – 23 June 2008 in Warsaw) was a Polish actor and bodybuilder. He appeared in many Polish movies.

Filmography

 Kochajmy syrenki (1967) – Clark in Boleslawiec (uncredited)
 Westerplatte (1967) – Private – 'Harbor' Outpost (uncredited)
 I Hate Mondays (1971) – Musician (uncredited)
 Czarne Chmury (1973) – człowiek margrabiego von Ansbach
 A Jungle Book of Regulations (1974) – Porter (uncredited)
 The Promised Land (1975) – Wilhelm Müller
 Zagrozenie (1976)
 Camouflage (1977) – Resort Manager
 Okrągły tydzień (1977) – Karols Kollege
 Spirala (1978) – Physician
 Hallo Szpicbródka, czyli ostatni występ króla kasiarzy (1978) – Actor
 Zerwane cumy (1979) – Seaman
 Boldyn (1982) – 'Grom'
 Czwartki ubogich (1981) – Kazio
 Filip z konopi (1983) – Andrzej's Friend (uncredited)
 Lata dwudzieste, lata trzydzieste (1984) – Boxer Grzes
 Milosc z listy przebojów (1985)
 Podróże pana Kleksa (1986) – Barnaba
 Tato, nie bój sie dentysty! (1986) – Father
 Rykowisko (1987) – Bodyguard
 Misja specjalna (1987) – Intelligence Officer Pretending Hans
 Republika nadziei (1988) – Bonawentura Spychalski
 Pan Kleks w kosmosie (1988)
 Swinka (1990) – Dolore's bodyguard (uncredited)
 Czarodziej z Harlemu (1990) – Kazik
 V.I.P. (1991) – Bunio
 Schindler's List (1993) – DEF SS Officer
 Dzieje mistrza Twardowskiego (1996) – Devil Barkalas
 Billboard (1998)
 Kilerów 2-óch (1999) – President's guard
 Quo Vadis (2001) – Casius
 The Hexer (2001) – Boholt
 Haker (2002) – Laura's father
 Jak to się robi z dziewczynami (2002) – Ada's Father
 Superprodukcja (2003) – Dziaslo
 Rys (2007) – Klemens

References

External links

Polish male actors
Polish bodybuilders
1943 births
2008 deaths
Sportspeople from Warsaw